This is a list of episodes of the television series Jay Jay the Jet Plane.

Episode consistency depends on the order: one episode says that the character Snuffy has not flown further away from Tarrytown than Lightning Bug Lake, but other episodes show him flying much further; in "Grumpy O'Malley", Snuffy still has not gotten rid of his initial shyness, but in many other episodes he shows no sign of shyness.

Series overview

Pilot series (1994–1996)

Television series (1998–2005)

Main series (1998–2001)

Season 1 (TLC era) (1998)

Season 2 (TLC era) (1999–2000)

Season 3 (PBS Kids era) (2001)

New Series: Jay Jay's Mysteries (2005)
"The Mystery of Plants" (September 5, 2005)
"The Mystery of Weather" (September 12, 2005)
"The Mystery of Size and Shape" (September 19, 2005)
"The Mystery of Flight" (September 26, 2005)
"The Mystery of the Five Senses" (October 3, 2005)
"The Mystery of Water" (October 10, 2005)
"The Mystery of Bugs" (October 17, 2005)
"The Mystery of Time" (October 24, 2005)
"The Mystery of Stars and Planets" (October 31, 2005)
"The Mystery of Dinosaurs" (November 25, 2005)

Video releases
There were videos in 1994-96 by BMG Video, 1998–99 by Kid Rhino and in 2000–05 by Tommy Nelson.

BMG Video (1994–96)
Jay Jay's First Flight (December 13, 1994)
Old Oscar Leads the Parade (February 21, 1995)
Tracy's Handy Hideout (October 29, 1996)
The Best of Jay Jay the Jet Plane (October 29, 1996)

Tommy Nelson: Wood Knapp Video Presentation and Kid Rhino Home Video (1998–2004)
Hero Herky (December 15, 1998)
Fantastic Faith (November 2, 1999)
Super Sonic Jay Jay (December 15, 1998)
Forever Friends (November 2, 1999)
Are We There Yet? (May 23, 2000)
Switch Around Day (May 18, 1999)
Hide and Seek (January 5, 1999)
Missing You (August 17, 1999)
You Are Special (November 2, 1999)
Wing Wigglin' (February 23, 1999)
Caring & Loving (February 1, 2000)
Listening & Learning (September 19, 2000)
Sunshiney Smiles (May 23, 2000)
Big Jake's Team (November 16, 1999)
Loop-De-Loop (May 18, 1999)
Tippy Toppy Peak (July 13, 1999)
Snuffy's Rainbow (April 11, 2000)
Never Give Up (August 6, 2002)
Bright 'n Beautiful (February 1, 2000)
Funny Face (April 11, 2000)
Learning to Trust (July 22, 2003)
Sharing & Giving (February 1, 2000)
Together Teamwork (February 6, 2001)
Dog Gone Doggy (May 23, 2000)
Herky Jerky (November 16, 1999)
Three Little Planes (May 23, 2000)
Taking Care of You (September 4, 2001)
Only One of Me (February 5, 2002)
God's Awesome Design (February 5, 2002)
Discovering Together (August 6, 2002)
Forgiveness & Understanding (February 4, 2003)
God's Hidden Treasures (February 3, 2004)
Being a Friend (February 4, 2003)

Columbia TriStar Home Entertainment/Sony Pictures Home Entertainment (2002–05)
Nature's Treasures (February 5, 2002)
Fun to Learn! (February 5, 2002)
New Friends, New Discoveries (February 5, 2002)
Adventures in Learning (February 5, 2002)
Soaring Sky High (April 23, 2002)
Learning Life's Little Lessons (April 23, 2002)
Friends Take Flight (April 23, 2002)
Supersonic Pals (April 23, 2002)
A Season to Share! (August 6, 2002)
First Flights and New Friends (August 6, 2002)
Lessons for All Seasons (August 6, 2002)
Something Special in Everyone (January 14, 2003)
Golden Rules of Growing Up (January 14, 2003)
Liking Yourself, Inside & Out (January 14, 2003)
Good Friends Forever! (May 13, 2003)
School is Cool! (July 12, 2005)
Imagination Station! (July 12, 2005)

Jay Jay The Jet Plane episodes list of